Barbora Krejčíková and Mandy Minella were the defending champions, but Krejčíková chose not to participate. Minella partnered Elise Mertens, and successfully defended her title, defeating Anna Smith and Renata Voráčová in the final 6–4, 6–4.

Seeds

Draw

External links
 Draw

Open de Limoges - Doubles
Open de Limoges